Liliac is a heavy metal band which was formed in Los Angeles in 2015 and is now based in Atlanta. Its members are siblings Melody Cristea, Samuel Cristea, Abigail Cristea, Ethan Cristea and Justin Cristea.  Liliac Kids Family Band Enter Sandman Cover  https://www.themusicman.uk/liliac/  The Music Man UK   By Cillian Cunningham  August 22, 2022 Retrieved November 2, 2022

Music

Their genre is often referred to as heavy metal, while they refer to it as "Vamp Metal".

Members
Melody Cristea (born December 27th, 2001) - vocals, bass, flute 
Samuel Cristea (born March 21st, 1999) - lead guitar, backing vocals 
Abigail Cristea (born February 24th, 2000) - drums 
Ethan Cristea (born August 24th, 2006) - bass, additional rhythm guitar 
Justin Cristea (born October 27th, 2007) - keyboard

History

Their father Florin was born in Transylvania, Romania.  He worked as a music producer for many years. He started the siblings playing music, drove them to their lessons and also started the band. Circa June 2022 they have produced two albums.  During the COVID epidemic, they moved their base from Los Angeles to Atlanta.  They were a common sight performing at the Santa Monica Pier for several years while building their fan base. Eventually they were "kicked out" because they were drawing crowds that were too large.  Florin also manages the band.

Liliac competed on The World's Best hosted by James Corden.  They also did a performance on America's Got Talent "that dropped the jaw of Simon Cowell".  "Sibling rockers Liliac aim to impact next generation of heavy metal music"   https://www.ajc.com/things-to-do/sibling-rockers-liliac-aim-to-impact-next-generation-of-heavy-metal-music/ZPKSA3MXJ5HPDBHHD2PRBRUDLQ/  The Atlanta Journal Constitution  By By Jordan Owen May 10, 2022  Retrieved November 2, 2022

The band name translates to “vampire bat” in Romanian, where Florin and their mother are from; Florin said that he was born about an hour from castle of Dracula.

Their recording "We Are The Children" from their 2nd album Queen of Hearts hit No. 1 on Amazon’s Rock Chart for New Releases and Best Sellers.

Discography

Their first album was Chain of Thorns released in 2019  followed by Queen of Hearts released in 2020. They also released three covers cd's: Covers Volume 1, Covers Volume 2 and Covers Volume 3.

References

External links

Heavy metal musical groups from Georgia (U.S. state)
Musical groups established in 2015